2gether is the debut album by 2gether, released in 2000. It includes the singles, "U + Me = Us (Calculus)", "Say It (Don't Spray It)", and "Before We Say Goodbye". It also contains "2Gether", which later became the theme song for the band's TV show. The name is a Wordplay of the word together. Most of the lyrics were written by the band's creators, Brian Gunn and Mark Gunn.

Track listing

Singles
"U + Me = Us (Calculus)" – released January 2000; did not chart.
"Say It (Don't Spray It)" – released April 2000; did not chart.
"Before We Say Goodbye" – released June 2000; did not chart.

Personnel
Evan Farmer – vocals, background vocals, co-writing on "You're My Baby Girl"
Noah Bastian – vocals, background vocals
Michael Cuccione – vocals, background vocals, co-writing on "Visualize"
Kevin Farley – vocals, background vocals
Alex Solowitz – vocals, background vocals
Nigel Dick – writing
Andrew Fromm – writing
Brian Gunn – writing
Mark Gunn – writing
Brian Kierulf – writing
Veit Renn – writing
Joshua M. Schwartz – writing

"Rub One Out" and "Breaking All The Rules" were performed by uncredited vocalists.

Charts
Album

References

2000 debut albums
2gether (band) albums